Junction Butte is a  summit located in the Island in the Sky District of Canyonlands National Park, in San Juan County, Utah. It is set about one mile south of the southern tip of Island in the Sky. A short hike to Grand View Point provides a view of Junction Butte. Access to this butte is via the four-wheel drive White Rim Road, which is another option to view Junction Butte. Topographic relief is significant as the top of this geological formation rises 1,400 feet above the road in less than one mile.  Precipitation runoff from Junction Butte drains east into the nearby Colorado River, and west into nearby Green River. Junction Butte is situated north of the junction of these two major rivers.

Geology
This feature is composed of hard, fine-grained Wingate Sandstone, which is the remains of wind-borne sand dunes deposited approximately 200 million years ago in the Late Triassic. This Wingate sandstone, capped by Kayenta Formation, forms steep cliffs as it overlays softer layers of the Chinle Formation.

Climate
Spring and fall are the most favorable seasons to visit Junction Butte. According to the Köppen climate classification system, it is located in a Cold semi-arid climate zone, which is defined by the coldest month having an average mean temperature below −0 °C (32 °F) and at least 50% of the total annual precipitation being received during the spring and summer.

See also
 Colorado Plateau
 Geology of the Canyonlands area

References

External links
 Canyonlands National Park National Park Service
 Junction Butte: weather forecast
 Junction Butte from Monument Basin (photo}: Flickr

Landforms of San Juan County, Utah
Colorado Plateau
Canyonlands National Park
Sandstone formations of the United States
Buttes of Utah
Rock formations of Utah
North American 2000 m summits